Xamiatus is a genus of spiders in the family Microstigmatidae. It was first described in 1981 by Raven. , it contains 5 species from Australia that are found in Queensland and New South Wales.

References

Microstigmatidae
Mygalomorphae genera
Spiders of Australia